Polyscias verrucosa is a species of plant in the family Araliaceae. It is endemic to French Polynesia. It is listed as a species of "Least Concern" on the IUCN Red List.

References

Flora of French Polynesia
verrucosa
Least concern plants
Taxonomy articles created by Polbot